The men's 9-ball doubles event at the 2017 Summer Universiade was held on 28 and 29 August at the Expo Dome, Taipei Expo Park.

Medallist

Results

References

External links 
 2017 Summer Universiade – Billiards

Men's doubles 9-ball